Idiobrotis is a monotypic snout moth genus (family Pyralidae). Its only species, Idiobrotis oxygrapha, is found in India. Both the genus and species were first described by Edward Meyrick in 1937.

References

Phycitinae
Monotypic moth genera
Moths of Asia